Sailors are people who work aboard a watercraft.

Sailors may also refer to:
Sailors (film), a 1964 Swedish film
Ken Sailors (1922-2016), American basketball player
Sports teams
Erie Sailors, baseball teams in Pennsylvania, USA
Goderich Sailors, ice hockey team in Ontario, Canada
Lynn Sailors, baseball teams in Massachusetts, USA
 Port Colorne Sailors, previous name of Port Colborne Pirates, ice hockey team in Ontario, Canada
Port Dover Sailors, ice hockey team in Ontario, Canada
Sarnia Sailors, ice hockey team in Ontario, Canada

See also
Sailor (disambiguation)
List of sailors